Minor (stylized in all lowercase)  is the debut EP by American singer-songwriter Gracie Abrams. It was released on July 14, 2020, through Interscope Records. Abrams co-wrote all the tracks. Production was mainly handled by Blake Slatkin.

Background 
Minor was announced on May 20, 2020. It was originally meant to be released on June 16, 2020, but was delayed to July 14, 2020 so as not to detract from the Black Lives Matter movement. It follows Abrams through "heartache" and "a break up".

Tour 
In support of Minor, Abrams scheduled the I've Missed You, I'm Sorry tour. It covered North America and the United Kingdom with 11 dates. It started on September 1, 2021, in Santa Ana, California, and concluded on October 20, 2021, in London, England. The tour also supported her singles "Mess It Up" and "Unlearn" with Benny Blanco.

Track listing

Personnel 
 Gracie Abrams – lead vocals (all tracks), songwriting (all tracks)
 Blake Slatkin – production (1, 3–7), songwriting (1, 3–4, 6–7)
 Jim-E Stack – production (1, 3), songwriting (1, 3), drum programming (1, 4), bass (4)
 Joel Little – production (2), songwriting (2)
 Jack Karaszewski – production (3), songwriting (3)
 Henry Kwapis – production (3), songwriting (3)
 Sarah Aarons – songwriting (2, 5)
 Carol Ades – songwriting (3, 5)
 Eli Teplin – songwriting (4), keyboard (4)
 Benny Blanco – production (7), songwriting (7)
 Rob Moose – strings (5), cello (6), piano (6), viola (6), violin (6)

Release history

References 

2020 debut EPs
Gracie Abrams albums
Interscope Records EPs